Eastern Metropolitan Bus Corporation or EMBC is one of the largest bus companies in the Philippines. The city operation plies routes from Antipolo, Rizal to Divisoria, Manila via Shaw Boulevard Ortigas Avenue. This bus company also offers tourist chartered and shuttle services.

History
Established in the 1970s by its late founder, Francisco Lim de Jesus, the company started as city operation along EDSA corridor through Baclaran-Letre-Navotas route.

In the mid-1990s, the Baclaran-Letre-Navotas route was retired. The company transferred the route into Antipolo-Baclaran via EDSA Ayala Avenue Shaw Boulevard before fully transferring its route into Antipolo-Divisoria.

EMBC has opened a tourist chartered service somewhere in the mid-90s. They also offer shuttle services using ordinary and air-conditioned buses for employees of some companies that are situated in Rizal province.

In December 2009, G Liner announced the acquisition of EMBC with only city operation bus units and its franchise due to focus of EMBC management on tourist chartered and shuttle services.

In January 2012, EMBC and RRCG transport formed the Siniloan (Laguna) – Philippine International Convention Center (PICC) via EDSA Buendia Tanay Antipolo Crossing Kapitolyo route.

Fleet
EMBC maintains Hino, Mitsubishi Fuso, as well as some aging Japanese units, some of which are air-conditioned units, and they were used for both city operation and shuttle service. All air-conditioned units were used as tourist chartered services, which the company utilizes almost of the same units as that of city operation. Plus, the new Daewoo bus BAR units of RRCG. And now its Rizal MetroLink Inc.

Destinations

Metro Manila
Divisoria, Manila
Quiapo, Manila
Lawton, Manila
EDSA Shaw/Crossing, Mandaluyong
Ayala, Makati*
Leveriza, Pasay*
Buendia Avenue (Gil Puyat Avenue), Makati*
EDSA Cubao Quezon City*
Jose Rizal University, Mandaluyong

Provincial Destinations
Antipolo, Rizal*
Tanay, Rizal*
Teresa, Rizal*
Baras, Rizal*
Morong, Rizal*
Taytay, Rizal*
Cainta, Rizal*
Angono, Rizal*
Binangonan, Rizal*
Cardona, Rizal*
San Mateo, Rizal*
Rodriguez, Rizal*
Pililla, Rizal*
Jalajala, Rizal*
Mabitac, Laguna*
Siniloan, Laguna*
Lipa City, Batangas City* in front of SM Lipa Grand Terminal via Turbina or ACTEX
Tanauan City, Batangas City*
Batangas City via ACTEX only* operated by Southern Carrier and RRCG Transport

(*) in partnership with RRCG.

Premium Point to Point Bus Service

Route: Robinsons Place Antipolo - SM City Masinag via vice veresa

Former Destinations
Baclaran, Parañaque
Alabang, Muntinlupa
Navotas Bus Terminal, Navotas
SM City Fairview, Quezon City

In media
 In a Filipino indie film, "Still Life" (2007), Glaiza de Castro's role waits on the terminal for a bus to ride. She died when a bus runs her over.

See also
 List of bus companies of the Philippines

References

External links
Eastern Metropolitan Bus Corporation Official Facebook Fan Page

Bus companies of the Philippines
Companies based in Rizal